In geology, basement and crystalline basement are crystalline rocks lying above the mantle and beneath all other rocks and sediments. They are sometimes exposed at the surface, but often they are buried under miles of rock and sediment. The basement rocks lie below a sedimentary platform or cover, or more generally any rock below sedimentary rocks or sedimentary basins that are metamorphic or igneous in origin. In the same way, the sediments or sedimentary rocks on top of the basement can be called a "cover" or "sedimentary cover".

Crustal rocks are modified several times before they become basement, and these transitions alter their composition.

Continental crust 
Basement rock is the thick foundation of ancient, and oldest, metamorphic and igneous rock that forms the crust of continents, often in the form of granite. Basement rock is contrasted to overlying sedimentary rocks which are laid down on top of the basement rocks after the continent was formed, such as sandstone and limestone. The sedimentary rocks which may be deposited on top of the basement usually form a relatively thin veneer, but can be more than 3 miles thick. The basement rock of the crust can be 20–30 miles thick, or more. The basement rock can be located under layers of sedimentary rock, or be visible at the surface.

Basement rock is visible, for example, at the bottom of the Grand Canyon, consisting of 1.7–2 billion year old granite (Zoroaster Granite) and schist (Vishnu Schist). The Vishnu Schist is believed to be highly metamorphosed igneous rocks  and shale, from basalt, mud and clay laid from volcanic eruptions, and the granite is the result of magma intrusions into the Vishnu Schist. An extensive cross section of sedimentary rocks laid down on top of it through the ages is visible as well.

Age 
The basement rocks of the continental crust tend to be much older than the oceanic crust. The oceanic crust can be from 0–340 million years in age, with an average age of 64Ma. Continental crust is older because continental crust is light and thick enough so it is not subducted, while oceanic crust is periodically subducted and replaced at subduction and oceanic rifting areas.

Complexity 

The basement rocks are often highly metamorphosed and complex, and are usually crystalline. They may consist of many different types of rock – volcanic, intrusive igneous and metamorphic. They may also contain ophiolites, which are fragments of oceanic crust that became wedged between plates when a terrane was accreted to the edge of the continent. Any of this material may be folded, refolded and metamorphosed. New igneous rock may freshly intrude into the crust from underneath, or may form underplating, where the new igneous rock forms a layer on the underside of the crust. The majority of continental crust on the planet is around 1–3 billion years old, and it is theorised that there was at least one period of rapid expansion and accretion to the continents during the Precambrian.

Much of the basement rock may have originally been oceanic crust, but it was highly metamorphosed and converted into continental crust. It is possible for oceanic crust to be subducted down into the Earth's mantle, at subduction fronts, where oceanic crust is being pushed down into the mantle by an overriding plate of oceanic or continental crust.

Volcanism 
When a plate of oceanic crust is subducted beneath an overriding plate of oceanic crust, as the underthrusting crust melts, it causes an upwelling of magma that can cause volcanism along the subduction front on the overriding plate. This produces an oceanic volcanic arc, like Japan. This volcanism causes metamorphism, introduces igneous intrusions, and thickens the crust by depositing additional layers of extrusive igneous rock from volcanoes. This tends to make the crust thicker and less dense, making it immune to subduction.

Oceanic crust can be subducted, while continental crust cannot. Eventually, the subduction of the underthrusting oceanic crust can bring the volcanic arc close to a continent, with which it may collide. When this happens, instead of being subducted, it is accreted to the edge of the continent and becomes part of it. Thin strips or fragments of the underthrusting oceanic plate may also remain attached to the edge of the continent so that they are wedged and tilted between the converging plates, creating ophiolites. In this manner, continents can grow over time as new terranes are accreted to their edges, and so continents can be composed of a complex quilt of terranes of varying ages.

As such, the basement rock can become younger going closer to the edge of the continent. There are exceptions, however, such as exotic terranes. Exotic terranes are pieces of other continents that have broken off from their original parent continent and have become accreted to a different continent.

Cratons 
Many continents can consist of several continental cratons – blocks of crust built around an initial original core of continents – that gradually grew and expanded as additional newly created terranes were added to their edges. For instance, Pangea consisted of most of the Earth's continents being accreted into one giant supercontinent. Most continents, such as Asia, Africa and Europe, include several continental cratons, as they were formed by the accretion of many smaller continents.

Usage
In European geology, the basement generally refers to rocks older than the Variscan orogeny. On top of this older basement Permian evaporites and Mesozoic limestones were deposited. The evaporites formed a weak zone on which the harder (stronger) limestone cover was able to move over the hard basement, making the distinction between basement and cover even more pronounced.

In Andean geology the basement refers to the Proterozoic, Paleozoic and early Mesozoic (Triassic to Jurassic) rock units as the basement to the late Mesozoic and Cenozoic Andean sequences developed following the onset of subduction along the western margin of the South American Plate.

When discussing the Trans-Mexican Volcanic Belt of Mexico the basement include Proterozoic, Paleozoic and Mesozoic age rocks for the Oaxaquia, the Mixteco and the Guerrero terranes respectively.

The term basement is used mostly in disciplines of geology like basin geology, sedimentology and petroleum geology in which the (typically Precambrian) crystalline basement is not of interest as it rarely contains petroleum or natural gas. The term economic basement is also used to describe the deeper parts of a cover sequence that are of no economic interest.

See also

References

Sources 

.

Stratigraphy

ja:基盤岩